Podurile may refer to several villages in Romania:

 Podurile, a village in Drajna Commune, Prahova County
 Podurile, a village in Chiojdeni Commune, Vrancea County